William Arthur Moloney (July 10, 1876 in Ottawa, Illinois – March 12, 1915 in Chicago, Illinois) was an American track and field athlete who competed at the 1900 Summer Olympics in Paris, France.

Moloney competed in the 400 metres. He finished tied for fourth overall in the event. He had won his first-round semifinal heat with a time of 51.0 seconds, but was one of three Americans who refused to take part in the final because it was held on a Sunday.

His brother Frederick also competed in the 1900 Olympics.

He died from heart disease in Chicago on March 12, 1915.

References

External links 

 De Wael, Herman. [Herman's Full Olympians: "Athletics 1900" .  Accessed 18 March 2006.
 

1876 births
1915 deaths
Athletes (track and field) at the 1900 Summer Olympics
Olympic track and field athletes of the United States
American male sprinters
People from Ottawa, Illinois
Track and field athletes from Illinois
University of Chicago alumni